Unknown Treasures is a 1926 American silent horror film directed by Archie Mayo and starring Gladys Hulette, Robert Agnew and John Miljan.  The screenplay by Charles A. Logue was based on a short story written by Mary Spain Vigus called The House Behind the Hedge. Although the film is considered lost today, it is said to have been a straight forward "old dark house" film without the usual 1920s comedy elements. Gustav von Seyffertitz plays the mad doctor in the film, and later went on to appear in several other horror films, including The Bat Whispers (1930) and Son of Frankenstein (1939). Director Mayo started out making comedic shorts, but moved on in later life to directing more prestigious films. He only directed two horror films however, this one and Svengali (1931 film).

Plot
Bob Ramsey is in love with Mary Hamilton, and he comes to suspect that her Uncle Cyrus has hidden a fortune in stolen bonds somewhere in his mansion. Bob tries to discover the hiding place of the old man's fortune, but only succeeds in getting involved in a complicated murder plot. A mad scientist named Dr. Simmons has trained a gorilla to kill people who get in his way.

Cast
 Gladys Hulette as Mary Hamilton 
 Robert Agnew as Bob Ramsey 
 John Miljan as Ralph Cheneey 
 Bertram Marburgh as Cyrus Hamilton 
 Jed Prouty as Remus 
 Gustav von Seyffertitz as Simmons

References

Bibliography
 Goble, Alan. The Complete Index to Literary Sources in Film. Walter de Gruyter, 1999.

External links

1926 films
1920s mystery films
American mystery films
Films directed by Archie Mayo
American silent feature films
American black-and-white films
1920s English-language films
1920s American films
Silent mystery films
Silent horror films